Manteno is a village in Kankakee County, Illinois, United States. The population was 9,204 at the 2010 census, up from 6,414 at the 2000 census. It is part of the Kankakee-Bourbonnais-Bradley Metropolitan Statistical Area.

History

Origins of village name
Manteno was named after Manteno (Mawteno), a daughter of Francois Bourbonnais, Jr. (thus her grandfather was the man for whom the city of Bourbonnais was named) and his Potawatomi wife. A Potawatomi name, it is a possible anglicization of manito or manitou, a Potawatomi word for "spirit". Oliver W. Barnard, an early settler in this area, spelled her name "Mantenau" in a poem, romanticizing the Potawatomi maiden. Other 19th century books spell it "Mawteno" and "Manteno".

Because she was of Potawatomi descent, Mawteno (spelled phonetically in the treaty, "Maw-te-no") was given a section of land, now part of Kankakee County, near Soldier Creek, by the treaty of Treaty of Tippecanoe of 1832.

Incorporation 
Both Kankakee and Iroquois counties were part of Will County, Illinois, before the State Legislature granted a plea of Kankakee's citizens and permitted them to incorporate in 1853.

The present township of Manteno was then the east half of the township of Rockville. On March 12, 1855, the town's petition that the area become the township of Manteno was granted by the county's board of supervisors.

The village was incorporated in 1869.

Geography
Manteno is located in northern Kankakee County at  (41.250129, -87.838282). It is bordered to the south by the village of Bourbonnais.

Interstate 57 passes through the west side of the village, with access from Exit 322. I-57 leads south  to Kankakee, the county seat, and north  to Chicago. Illinois Route 50 passes through the center of Manteno as Locust Street and leads north  to Peotone and south  to Bradley.

Demographics

As of the census of 2000, there were 6,414 people, 2,578 households, and 1,789 families residing in the village. The racial makeup of the village was 97.79% White, 0.27% African American, 0.17% Native American, 0.20% Asian, 0.02% Pacific Islander, 0.98% from other races, and 0.58% from two or more races. Hispanic or Latino of any race were 2.82% of the population.

There were 2,578 households, out of which 32.5% had children under the age of 18 living with them, 57.8% were married couples living together, 8.7% had a female householder with no husband present, and 30.6% were non-families. 25.6% of all households were made up of individuals, and 9.6% had someone living alone who was 65 years of age or older. The average household size was 2.48 and the average family size was 3.00.

In the village, the population was spread out, with 26.3% under the age of 18, 7.3% from 18 to 24, 30.3% from 25 to 44, 21.6% from 45 to 64, and 14.5% who were 65 years of age or older. The median age was 36 years. For every 100 females, there were 97.5 males. For every 100 females age 18 and over, there were 93.4 males.

The median income for a household in the village was $48,599, and the median income for a family was $56,077. Males had a median income of $46,359 versus $25,675 for females. The per capita income for the village was $22,826. About 3.9% of families and 5.3% of the population were below the poverty line, including 5.8% of those under age 18 and 3.9% of those age 65 or over.

Economy
There is a combination of industrial and agricultural employers in town. Farmers Elevator Company of Manteno stands as the tallest site in town, with the ability to house 2 million bushels of corn or soybeans at any one time.

Manteno is home the Diversatech Industrial Park is on the east side of town. It contains many diversified industrial plants and warehousing complexes.

It received its first patients in 1930 and closed in 1985. That closure and the 1983 closure of Hilman Hospital, a general medical hospital, brought economic stagnation to the town. The north half of the original campus of the state hospital has been turned into a veterans' home. Some buildings have been torn down and housing has been put up. A lot of the buildings have been renovated, and very few buildings on the south side of the campus are left in original condition, but are still abandoned.

Although the village once had direct access to Chicago via a commuter line, that railroad hasn't operated since the 1920s.

Education

Manteno Public Schools are part of the Manteno Community Unit School District 5. The district has an elementary school, middle school and high school. Students attend Manteno High School. The schools together have about 2,200 students.

Notable people

 Fred Sylvester Breen, Arizona newspaper editor and politician, born in Manteno

 George R. Lawrence, photography and aviation pioneer; lived in Manteno and is buried there
 John Moisant, aviator, lived in Manteno
 Charles A. Spring, Presbyterian leader and son of Samuel Spring; helped establish the First Presbyterian Church of Manteno (1859)
Elizabeth Packard, crusader/activist for married women's property rights and the rights of the mentally ill. Lived in Manteno 1857 to 1860, then again 1863 to 1864 or later. Her children dwelled in Manteno 1857 to 1864, and intermittently for longer.

 Harold R.  McQueen, corn/soybean farmer and former National Tractor Pulling Champion, farmer, lived in Manteno and aided in the filming of the movie "The Hunter"; featuring the actor Steve McQueen.

References
14. Manteno (Images of America series). Written by Melanie Holmes. Published February 10, 2020. Arcadia Publishing. ISBN 9781467104487

External links

City-Data.com

Villages in Kankakee County, Illinois
Villages in Illinois
Populated places established in 1855
1855 establishments in Illinois